The Peck Slip Ferry was a pre-Brooklyn Bridge ferry route connecting Manhattan and Williamsburg, Brooklyn, New York City, United States, joining Peck Slip (Manhattan) and Broadway (Brooklyn) across the East River.

History
The Peck Slip Ferry began operations in 1836, supplementing the Grand Street Ferry. The Manhattan ferry port was located along the east side of the former Old Fulton Fish Market building within the South Street Seaport.

See also
List of ferries across the East River

References

East River
Ferries of New York City